Cave Lake State Park is a public recreation area occupying more than  in the Schell Creek Range, adjacent to Humboldt National Forest, in White Pine County, Nevada. It features a  reservoir for fishing and flat-wake boating.

History
The Cave Creek Dam which created Cave Lake was constructed in 1932. The facility was purchased by the Nevada Department of Wildlife in 1971 for $10. Two years later it was transferred to Nevada State Parks.

Activities and amenities
The park is popular for brown and rainbow trout fishing, ice fishing, crawdadding, camping, and picnicking. Hiking is offered on four developed trails, three to five miles in length. For overnight stays, the park offers a yurt and two designated campgrounds, Elk Flat and Lake View, with modern facilities. Winter activities include ice fishing, ice skating, cross-country skiing, and snowmobiling.

Ely's annual Fire and Ice Festival is held in January at the park, sufficient ice and snow permitting. The event, which began in 2005, features an ice and snow sculpture contest, and concludes with a fireworks show. Bathtub races have also been held at the lake each year since 2010. Both events have been named by the American Bus Association among the top 100 events in North America.

References

External links

Cave Lake State Park Nevada State Parks
Cave Lake State Park Trail Map Nevada State Parks

State parks of Nevada
Protected areas of the Great Basin
Protected areas of White Pine County, Nevada
Protected areas established in 1973
1973 establishments in Nevada
Reservoirs in Nevada
Great Basin National Heritage Area